Marcin Pietrowski (born 1 March 1988, in Gdańsk) is a Polish footballer who plays for Miedź Legnica in the I liga.

Career

Miedź Legnica
On 7 February 2020 Miedź Legnica confirmed, that Pietrowski had joined the club on a deal until June 2021. In January 2021, he no longer appeared as a part of the clubs squad on Miedź' official website, although there were no reports about him leaving the club.

Career statistics

Club

Honours

Club

Piast Gliwice
Ekstraklasa: 2018–19

References

External links
 
 

Polish footballers
Lechia Gdańsk players
Piast Gliwice players
Miedź Legnica players
Ekstraklasa players
Sportspeople from Gdańsk
1988 births
Living people
Association football midfielders